Fatih (Arabic: فَاتِح fātiḥ) is both an Arabic and Turkish masculine given name originating from the Arabic, meaning "conqueror, victor". Notable people named Fatih include:

 el-Fātiḥ (the Conqueror), alternate name of Ottoman Sultan Mehmet II
 Fatih Ahıskalı (born 1976), Turkish musician
 Fatih Akın (born 1973), German film director, screenwriter and producer of Turkish descent
 Fatih Akyel (born 1977), Turkish footballer
 Fatih Altaylı (born 1963), Turkish journalist, columnist and television presenter
 Fatih Atık (born 1984), French-Turkish footballer
 Fatih Avan (born 1989), Turkish javelin thrower
 Fatih Baydar (born 1983), Turkish weightlifter
 Fatih Birol (born 1958), Turkish energy economist
 Fatih Ceylan (born 1980), Turkish footballer
 Fatih Çakıroğlu (born 1981), Turkish sports wrestler
 Fatih Çelik, Turkish Paralympic Para Taekwondo practitioner
 Fatih Egedik (born 1982), Turkish footballer
 Fatih Erkoç (born 1953), Turkish jazz and pop music singer
 Fatih Keleş (born 1989), Turkish amateur boxer
 Fatih Kırtorun (born 1985), Turkish poet and translator
 Fatih Kisaparmak (born 1961), Turkish folk music singer and songwriter
 Fatih Kocamis (born 1974), Turkish-German mixed martial arts fighter
 Fatih Öztürk (born 1983), Turkish footballer
 Fatih Solak (born 1980), Turkish basketball player
 Fatih Sonkaya (born 1981), Turkish footballer
 Fatih Tekke (born 1977), Turkish footballer
 Fatih Terim (born 1953), Turkish football manager and former player
 Fatih Turan (born 1993), Turkish footballer
 Fatih Üçüncü, Turkish wrestler in Greco-Roman style
 Fatih Yılmaz (born 1989), German footballer of Turkish descent
 Fatih Yiğen (born 1983), Turkish footballer
 Fatih Yiğituşağı (born 1983), Turkish footballer

See also
Fateh (name)
Mehmed the Conqueror (Turkish Fatih Sultan Mehmet)

Turkish masculine given names